Catherine Poirot (born 9 April 1963 in Tours) is a French former breaststroke swimmer who competed in the 1980 Summer Olympics and in the 1984 Summer Olympics.

References

1963 births
Living people
Sportspeople from Tours, France
French female breaststroke swimmers
Olympic swimmers of France
Swimmers at the 1980 Summer Olympics
Swimmers at the 1984 Summer Olympics
Olympic bronze medalists for France
Olympic bronze medalists in swimming
Medalists at the 1984 Summer Olympics
Swimmers at the 1979 Mediterranean Games